Guido Sacconi (born 23 June 1948 in Udine) is an Italian politician and Member of the European Parliament for the Central region with the Democrats of the Left (DS), part of the Socialist Group, and sits on the European Parliament's Committee on the Environment, Public Health and Food Safety.

He is a substitute for the Committee on Agriculture and Rural Development, a member of the Delegation for relations with the People's Republic of China and a substitute for the Delegation for relations with the countries of South-east Europe.

Career 
 1967: Studied philosophy at the University of Florence
 1972: Responsible for the research office at the Chamber of Labour of Florence
 Member of the Provincial Secretariat (1975) and then General Secretary (1978) of FIOM CGIL (Federazione Impiegati Operai Metallurgici)
 1990: General Secretary of the Chamber of Labour of Florence
 until 1992: Regional Secretary of CGIL for Tuscany
 since 1992: Regional Secretary of the Democratic Party of the Left - Tuscany
 Member (1995) and then Vice-Chairman (1998) of the Regional Council of Tuscany
 1995-1998: Secretary of the PDS Florentine Metropolitan Union
 since 1999: Member of the European Parliament
 Member of the delegation from the European Parliament to the Earth Summit 2002 (in Johannesburg), and to the Ninth Conference of the Parties to the UN Framework

See also
 2004 European Parliament election in Italy

External links 
 
 
 

1948 births
Living people
People from Udine
MEPs for Italy 2004–2009
MEPs for Italy 1999–2004
Democrats of the Left MEPs